Daniel Qampicha is an Anglican bishop in Kenya: he has been Bishop of Marsabit since his consecration on 1 May 2016.

References 

Anglican bishops of Marsabit
Anglicanism in Kenya
Living people
Kenyan Anglicans
Year of birth missing (living people)